Saint-Damien-de-Buckland is a parish municipality in the Bellechasse Regional County Municipality, in the Chaudière-Appalaches region of Quebec.  The population was 1,956 in the Canada 2016 Census.

IPL, a manufacturer of wheeled carts and other plastic related products, is located in Saint-Damien and is the biggest employer in the immediate area.

Demographics 

Notable people 
Lauriane Genest, professional racing cyclist

See also
 Sisters of Our Lady of Perpetual Help

References

Parish municipalities in Quebec
Incorporated places in Chaudière-Appalaches